Cathrinus "Rinus" Dijkstra (born 19 October 1969), professionally known as Zanger Rinus (Dutch for "Singer Rinus"), is a Dutch musician.

Biography 
In 2009 Rinus released the song Hey Marlous, an adaptation of Schöne Maid, hast Du heut' für mich Zeit by the German singer Tony Marshall from 1972. Hey Marlous is about Dutch singer Marlous Oosting. He became well-known among the general public because the television program De Wereld Draait Door paid attention to it in one of their broadcast in the section De tv draait door.

After this followed more clips, such as Hé Kastelein (2010) and Met Romana op de Scooter. The latter song was put on YouTube on 8 July 2011 and was viewed more than 300,000 times within five days. The song also attracted international attention: on the American news blog The Huffington Post an article was dedicated to the video.

His life partner Debora (since 1998) can often be seen in his video clips. Both also make an appearance in the song "Make you pop" by Diplo & Don Diablo.

Rinus has an intellectual disability. In his daily life, he is a woodworker in a social workshop.

Singles 
 Hey Marlous (2009) (original by Tony Marshall with Schöne Maid, hast Du heut' für mich Zeit)
 Ik ben een kermiskind (2009)
 Verliefd op het meisje van de oliebollenkraam (2009) (original by De Slijpers with De Slijpers van Parijs)
 Hé kastelein (2010)
 Ushi Dushi (2010)
 Met Romana op de scooter (2011), nr. 98 iTunes Top 100 (original by Vader Abraham with Uche, uche, uche)
 De rups (2011)
 Jij mag eerder rijden (Kiele kiele kiele een auto heeft 4 wielen) (2011)
 Heb jij mijn piek gezien? (2011)
 My Jinglebells Are Gone (2011)
 We are de Sjampions (2012) (European Championship-hit)
 Met Sharon in een luchtballon (2012)
 Eet veel bananen (2012) (with Ronnie Ruysdael)
 Op de bakfiets naar Tirol (2013)
 Hey Marlous (German version) (2013)
 Koele Piet Piet Piet (2013)
 Clean This Shit Up (2013) (with e.g. Rapper Sjors, De Stoopjes, Johan Bos and Eric van Tijn)
 Waar moet ie in? (2014) (World Cup-hit)
 Carnaval met Rinus (2015)
 De straat is mijn camping (2015)
 Oh Chantal! (Wanneer blijf je bij me slapen?) (2016)
 Doutzen (2017)

Chart performance

External links 
 Official website (Dutch)
 Official photo website (Dutch)

Sources, notes and/or references

1969 births
Living people
Dutch singers
People from Drachten